Boomtown Reno is a hotel and casino located in Verdi, Nevada, just west of the Reno–Sparks metropolitan area. The hotel has 318 guest rooms and suites and the casino has a  gaming area.

History 
The property originally began as a truck stop, then named Bill and Effie's, in the mid-1960s serving travelers on Interstate 80 and gradually expanded into a full hotel-casino resort.

Previous owners of Boomtown Reno were businessman and former Reno mayor Bob Cashell of Cashell Enterprises (1968–1988), Boomtown, Inc. (1988–1997) and Pinnacle Entertainment, formerly known as Hollywood Park, Inc. (1997–2012)

In 2012, Pinnacle sold the property for $12.9 million to St. John Properties (a Maryland-based real estate firm) and M1 Gaming (the company of former Station Casinos executive Dean DiLullo). In 2014, M1 Gaming exited the property and St. John began the process of taking full ownership of Boomtown.

The Boomtown hotel became affiliated with Best Western in 2016.

On February 26, 2018, a man was fatally shot on the property.

As of 2022, the Property has closed its buffet with no plans for reopening.

Features 
The hotel is remodeled in contemporary motif and has full casino with slots, table games, sports book, poker and Keno. A  Family Fun Center features games,  a motion theater, virtual rides, Ferris wheel, carousel and a 9-hole miniature golf course.

There is a Mel's Diner, Steakhouse, Peet's Coffee and Market Fresh Deli located inside well.

Gallery

See also

 List of casinos in Nevada
 Boomtown Bossier City
 Boomtown New Orleans
 Silverton Las Vegas

References

External links

 

1964 establishments in Nevada
Buildings and structures completed in 1964
Casino hotels
Casinos completed in 1964
Casinos in Reno, Nevada
Former truck stops
Hotel buildings completed in 1978
Hotels in Reno, Nevada
Resorts in Nevada